Marrowbone, Kentucky may refer to the following places in the U.S. state of Kentucky:
Marrowbone, Cumberland County, Kentucky
Marrowbone, Pike County, Kentucky